Colaspis louisianae is a species of leaf beetle from North America. It is distributed in Texas and Louisiana in the United States. It is close in appearance to Colaspis brunnea.

According to Chapin (1979), C. louisianae is the most common species of the genus Colaspis in field crops in Louisiana.

References

Further reading

 

Eumolpinae
Articles created by Qbugbot
Taxa named by Doris Holmes Blake
Beetles described in 1974
Beetles of the United States